Deathstalker II, also known as Deathstalker II: Duel of the Titans, is a 1987 Argentine-American fantasy comedy-adventure film directed by Jim Wynorski and a sequel to 1983's Deathstalker. It was written by Neil Ruttenberg (with an extensive uncredited rewrite by Wynorski, Terlesky and R. J. Robertson) and starring John Terlesky, Monique Gabrielle, John LaZar and María Socas. Terlesky replaced Rick Hill, the protagonist from the previous film, in the starring role of Deathstalker. This is the last sword and sorcery movie that Roger Corman produced in Argentina during the 80s.

Owing to its low-cost production and the perceived self-awareness of the movie, Wynorski called the film an "anachronistic comedy of sorts".

Synopsis 
Princess Evie of the Jzafir kingdom is possessed by the sorcerer Jerak, who creates an evil clone of Evie. Through the clone, Jerak and his voluptuous and dangerous ally, Sultana, rule over Jzafir. The real Evie escapes Jerak's control, and posing as a queen named Reena the Seer she enlists the aid of the renowned hero Deathstalker. Together they fight against the forces of evil to take back Evie's kingdom.

Cast 
 John Terlesky ... Deathstalker
 Monique Gabrielle ... Reena the Seer/Princess Evie
 John LaZar ... Jarek the Sorcerer
 Toni Naples ... Sultana
 María Socas ... Amazon Queen
 Marcos Woinsky ... Pirate
 Dee Booher ... Amazon Champion Wrestler Gorgo (as Queen Kong)
 Jacques Arndt ... High Priest (as Jake Arnt)
 Carina Davi ... Young Amazon
 Jim Wynorski ... Dying Soldier (as Arch Stanton)
 Douglas Mortimer ... Man in Black
 Maria Luisa Carnivani ... Woman Guard
 Leo Nichols ... Pirate's Hitman One
 Frank Sisty ... Pirate's Hitman Two
 Red Sands ... Pirate's Hitman Three
 Dan Savio ... Pirate's Hitman Four
 William Feldman ... Pirate's Hitman Five
 Nick Sardansky ... Evie's Victim

Production 
Roger Corman had a deal to make several sword and sorcery films in Argentina in a coproduction deal with Aries Cinematográfica Argentina, of which Deathstalker II was the last. Corman asked Jim Wynorski, who had just made Chopping Mall (1986) for Corman, to direct it. Wynorski said Corman was upset that he did not get the chance to produce Conan the Barbarian (1982): "he should have done Conan, but he didn’t, someone else did it and he said 'I’m gonna copy it', so that’s what he did."

Casting 
Wynorski cast several actors he had worked with before, including John Terlesky. Terlesky was dating Monique Gabrielle at the time, and he had also dated Toni Naples, and both were chosen for the cast. Wynorski also hired John LaZar because he had been in Beyond the Valley of the Dolls (1970).

Wynorski described working with Maria Socas, who had already starred in The Warrior and the Sorceress (1984; the second sword-and-sorcery film Corman produced in Argentina), the following way: "Maria Socas was/is a very sweet person, she was trying to do the role [the Amazon Queen] serious, and finally I just said: 'play it serious and we’ll do comedy around you'."

Monique Gabrielle later described the film as her favorite:
It was a very difficult shoot, in a way, because we were shooting in Argentina and our script had a lot of stunts that couldn't be done with the limitations they had down there. It wasn't safe and there were a lot of problems. I almost got dropped into a pot of water, which, luckily, wasn't boiling (it was supposed to be). But, besides all that, it was really my favorite because I loved the role I played. I got to play dual characters.
Wynorski said "it took a lot from me" to get Gabrielle to play comedy: "she had more apogee for playing the evil queen, but I said 'you have to play yourself', which is very sweet, and 'you have to play [it] as a funny, you know, waif', and she did, she did a good job."

Writing 
There was a script by Neil Ruttenberg which Wynorski felt was "terrible", so the latter rewrote it with Terlesky and regular collaborator R. J. Robertson. Wynorski said the original script "was trying to be a Conan movie, and I just said, you know, 'not what I want to do'. And I want to be entertaining and I had John who was very, very personable, and I had Toni and Monique and John (LaZar) and Queen Kong, when she was there, and some of the Spanish actors spoke English very well, and they were very happy to do something different".

Wynorski explained: "we kinda did our version of It Happened One Night (1934)". He wrote two parts for Monique Gabrielle "because it gave me an extra person, I needed a lot of people who could speak English and so, by creating a dual role for Monique, I created yet another character, and every night, John and I would go back to the hotel and rewrite new stuff and shoot it over the next couple of days."

Filming 
Wynorski reused sets from the previous sword-and-sorcery films Corman made in Argentina. He also stated that "the sets were pretty much trashed by the time I got there, cause I think I was the last guy to use them before they got torn down".

Wynorski said the producer, Frank Isaac, was "very upset" because they kept changing the original script: "finally he [Isaac] got so angry about it he called Roger Corman, and Roger Corman’s family came down and Roger watched [the] dailies and said, 'This is fine, keep going'". When Corman got back to California, Wynorski asked him to send down the biggest lady wrestler he could find. Corman hired Dee Booher for the production, and so Wynorski filmed the Queen Kong scene with her.

Wynorski stated that the Argentinian producers "didn’t want to spend any money on this production, and it was difficult to get them to pony up a little money for extras or anything, but, you know, Roger kept calling up and saying, you owe me this, give it to the guy – and again, we were trying to be fun, without spending a lot of money and I think we got away with it, a lot of people enjoyed the movie because it doesn’t take itself seriously at all. It’s a comedy with action".

Re-release 
The film was re-released in the 2000s by Shout! Factory as "Roger Corman's Cult Classics: Sword and Sorcery Collection". The collection features Deathstalker, Deathstalker II, Barbarian Queen and The Warrior and the Sorceress.

The release of Deathstalker II on this collection is quite different from past VHS and DVD releases. It features a new Anamorphic Widescreen Transfer (1.78:1) and an Approved Director's Cut of the film.

References

External links 
 
 

1987 films
1980s fantasy adventure films
American fantasy adventure films
American sword and sorcery films
1980s English-language films
English-language Argentine films
Films directed by Jim Wynorski
Deathstalker (film series)
Argentine fantasy adventure films
Films shot in Argentina
1980s American films